CID The Dummy is an 3D adventure video game released for the PlayStation 2, Wii, Microsoft Windows and PlayStation Portable on April 17, 2009, in Europe and July 7, 2009, in North America.

Plot
The game takes numerous cues from Mega Man for the NES featuring a story about two scientists, once colleagues and now bitter rivals. After an experiment gone wrong, D.Troit (a pun of the city of Detroit), the game's villain, creates an army of sentient robots and kidnaps the daughter of B. M. Werken (a pun of the motor vehicle brand Bayerische Motoren Werk or BMW for short). Werken retaliates by creating a crash test dummy, or Crash Impact Dummy (CID, hence the title), the hero and the game's playable character, to defeat D. Troit and his armies and save Werken's daughter. Werken is assisted by a small flying robot in the original but is renamed later as Copcam which is an anagram for Capcom.

Demake
Crash Dummy is a demake developed by Twelve Games and published by Funbox Media and released digitally on the Nintendo Switch on February 28, 2019, PC via Steam on Mar 1, 2019, and the Sony PlayStation 4 on Mar. 4, 2019 respectively as a  into a 2D side-scroller. Links to both an iOS and Android versions of the game exist on the company's website but no longer function due to these versions being delisted from those platforms and instead were ported up to consoles and PC.

Reception
CID The Dummy received negative reviews upon its release. On Metacritic, the game holds scores of 41/100 for the PlayStation Portable version based on 6 reviews, and 31/100 for the Wii version based on 7 reviews. On GameRankings, the game holds scores of 36.00% for the PlayStation 2 version based on 2 reviews, 35.60% for the PlayStation Portable version based on 5 reviews, and 33.43% for the Wii version based on 7 reviews. The game was panned by both gamers and critics for its lackluster gameplay, sluggish controls, poor graphics and awful voice acting. The game is also notable for using music on the game's Wii startup page that is a shoddy cover of Fatboy Slim's "Weapon of Choice" and the battle music "Let The Battles Begin" from Final Fantasy VII during a driving level. In some levels, the game also feature images plagiarized from various sources.

The demake is plagued with poor controls, lackluster sounds and music, dull graphics, imprecise jumping and platforming, numerous typos and errors in grammar during cutscenes with text, confusing level design, poor story, and lack of replay value.

In both games, the playable character CID comes off as being an unlikable protagonist. After rescuing Werken's daughter in the game's final cutscenes, he claims that he never really cared for her safety and well being or stopping D.Troit's plans. Instead, he boasts about his given "mission" as an opportunity to simply cause his own brand of trouble for his own amusement with no comedic or sarcastic tone.

References

External links
 GameSpot Summary

2009 video games
Cancelled Xbox games
PlayStation 2 games
Video games developed in Italy
Wii games
Windows games
PlayStation Portable games
Oxygen Games games